Grant Fowler (born 12 March 1957) is a former Australian rules footballer who played with Fitzroy, Essendon and Hawthorn in the Victorian Football League (VFL).

From Trinity Grammar originally, Fowler made his league debut as a 19-year-old in the 1976 VFL season. A rover, he kicked 18 goals from 12 appearances in 1977.

He made his way to Essendon in 1980 and was a regular member of the team in his first three seasons, which included participation in a night premiership.

Fowler briefly retired in 1983 due to his work commitments and saw out the season at Hawthorn after getting a clearance late in the year. He added just one further game in 1984, his 100th VFL appearance.

References

1957 births
Fitzroy Football Club players
Essendon Football Club players
Hawthorn Football Club players
Australian rules footballers from Victoria (Australia)
Living people